Coronel may refer to:

 Archaic and Spanish variant of colonel
 Coronel, Chile, a port city in Chile
 Battle of Coronel off the Chilean coast during World War I
 The World War II German auxiliary cruiser HSK Coronel, see German night fighter direction vessel Togo
 Coronelism, a Brazilian political machine during the Old Republic (1889–1930)

People
 Antonio F. Coronel (1817–1894), mayor of Los Angeles from 1853 to 1854
 Christian Coronel (born 1980), professional basketball player in the Philippine Basketball Association
 Dannes Coronel (1973–2020), Ecuadorian footballer
 Felipe Coronel (born 1978), aka Immortal Technique, a Peruvian American rapper and political activist
 Gregorio Nuñez Coronel (~1548 ~ 1620), Portuguese Augustinian theologian, writer, and preacher
 Jorge Icaza Coronel (1906–1978), writer from Ecuador 
 Juan Coronel (1569–1651), Spanish Franciscan missionary 
 Luis Núñez Coronel / Ludovicus Coronel (c. 1480–c. 1531), Spanish clergyman, natural philosopher
 Mace Coronel (born 2004), American child actor
 Nachman Nathan Coronel (1810–1890), 19th century Jewish scholar
 Pastor Coronel (1929–2000), chief of the Investigations Department of Paraguay
 Pedro Coronel (1923–1985), Mexican abstract painter, sculptor, draughtsman, and engraver
 Rafael Coronel (born 1931), artist and painter from Mexico 
 Coronel (footballer) (born 1935), Antônio Evanil da Silva, Brazilian footballer
 Sheila Coronel, winner of the 2003 Magsaysay Award for Journalism
 Stephen Coronel (born 1951), guitarist 
 Tim Coronel (born 1972), Dutch auto racing driver and twin brother of Tom
 Tom Coronel (born 1972), Dutch auto racing driver and twin brother of Tim
 Uri Coronel (1946–2016), Dutch sports director (AFC Ajax)

See also
Colonel (disambiguation)
The Colonel (disambiguation)